Hal Skelly (James Harold Skelley; May 31, 1891 – June 16, 1934) was an American Broadway and film actor.

Biography
He was born James Harold Skelley in Alleghenyville, Pennsylvania to James and Martha Skelley. His family moved to Davenport, Iowa when he was four.  He had four sisters and three brothers.  Skelley was educated at Sacred Heart School in Davenport and St. Bede Academy in Peru, Illinois. He left home at the age of 15 and joined the circus.  He acted in his first stage production, The Time, the Place and the Girl, at the LaSalle Theater in Chicago when he was 16.  For a short period of time he was a backup first baseman for the Boston Braves and a prizefight manager.  For his professional name he shortened his middle name Harold to Hal and dropped the final "e" in Skelley.

Skelly became a veteran of medicine shows, musical comedy, burlesque, Lew Dockstader's minstrels and opera.  He joined the A.M. Zinn musical comedy company in San Francisco where his eccentric dancing ability earned him the nickname "Tumbling Harold Skelly". Always enamored with the circus, he spent a year with Barnum & Bailey.  Skelly toured China and Japan with a musical comedy troupe, the Raymond Teale Company.

Skelly made his Broadway debut in Fiddler’s Three (1918) and went on to appear in ten other shows on Broadway. In 1927, he played a starring role alongside Barbara Stanwyck, in her first Broadway hit, the musical production Burlesque. Paramount Pictures invited the two to star in the 1929 talkie film version of the show, retitled The Dance of Life because studio executives judged the original title too risqué. Stanwyck turned down the offer, while Skelly accepted, reprising his role as "Skid Johnson". He would make a total of ten films, including the Woman Trap (1929), Behind the Make-Up (1930), and The Shadow Laughs (1933), and was also featured on two movie soundtracks.

Death

Skelly was killed in a train-auto accident in West Cornwall, Connecticut when the truck he was driving was struck by the New York to Pittsfield train of the New Haven Railroad at a crossing.

News reports at the time said he was staying with friends and he was looking for a dog that had run away. His widow, Eunice, brought his body back to New York City for the funeral, which was held in the Actor's Chapel at Saint Malachy's Catholic Church in Manhattan. His mother and his brother Hugh accompanied the body back to Davenport for burial at St. Marguerite's Cemetery, now known as Mount Calvary Cemetery.

Broadway
Hal Skelly acted in the following shows on Broadway:
Fiddlers Three (1918), as Sam Wigglesbury
The Night Boat (1920), as Freddie Ides
The Girl in the Spotlight (1920), as Watchem Tripp
Orange Blossoms (1922), as Jimmy Flynn
Mary Jane McKane (1923–1924), as Joe McGillicudy
Betty Lee (1924–1925), as Wallingford Speed
Burlesque, (1927–1928), as Skid Johnson
Melody (1933), as François Trapadoux
Ghost Writer (1933), as Bill Harkins
Queer People (1934), as Theodore Anthony White
Come What May (1934), as Chet Harrison

Filmography
Hal Skelly acted in the following films:
The Dancing Town (1928; short)
The Dance of Life  (1929) as 'Skid'
Woman Trap (1929) as Dan Malone
Behind the Make-Up (1930) as Hap Brown
Men Are Like That (1930) as J. Aubrey Piper (*copy held at Library of Congress)
The Gob (1930; short)
The Struggle  (1931) as Jimmie Wilson
Hotel Variety (1933)
The Shadow Laughs (1933) as Robin Dale
The Chump  (1934; short)

Discography
Hal Shelly is featured on the following recordings:
The Dance of Life (1929) featured: "True Blue Lou" / "The Flippity Flop"
Men Are Like That (1930) featured: "In the Gloaming" 1877

References

External links

 

1891 births
1934 deaths
Actors from Davenport, Iowa
American male film actors
American male stage actors
Male actors from Iowa
20th-century American male actors
Catholics from Iowa
Railway accident deaths in the United States
Road incident deaths in Connecticut